The 2020 Critérium du Dauphiné was the 72nd edition of the Critérium du Dauphiné, a road cycling stage race. The race took place between 12 and 16 August 2020 in France, having originally been scheduled for 31 May to 7 June, and then postponed due to the COVID-19 pandemic in France. On 24 February 2020, the race organisers, the Amaury Sport Organisation (ASO), announced the route at a presentation in Lyon.

Teams
All 19 UCI WorldTeams and four wildcard UCI ProTeams make up the twenty-two teams of seven riders each that participated in the race. Of the 161 riders that started the race, only 106 finished.

UCI WorldTeams

 
 
 
 
 
 
 
 
 
 
 
 
 
 
 
 
 
 
 

UCI ProTeams

Route

Stages

Stage 1
12 August 2020 — Clermont-Ferrand to Saint-Christo-en-Jarez,

Stage 2
13 August 2020 — Vienne to Col de Porte,

Stage 3
14 August 2020 — Corenc to Saint-Martin-de-Belleville,

Stage 4
15 August 2020 — Ugine to Megève,

Stage 5
16 August 2020 — Megève to Megève, 

Before the stage, Primož Roglič, who was leading the general and points classifications, abandoned the race due to the injuries he sustained from a crash the day before.

Classification leadership table

 On stage two, Daryl Impey, who was second in the points classification, wore the green jersey, because first placed Wout van Aert wore the yellow jersey as the leader of the general classification.
 On stage four, Wout van Aert, who was second in the points classification, wore the green jersey, because first placed Primož Roglič wore the yellow jersey as the leader of the general classification. On stage five, van Aert wore the green jersey again because Roglič, who led the classification, did not start the stage due to injuries.
 On stage five, no rider wore the yellow jersey, since first placed Primož Roglič did not start the stage due to injuries.

Classification standings

General classification

Points classification

Mountains classification

Young rider classification

Teams classification

Notes

References

External links
Official site

2020 UCI World Tour
2020 in French sport
2020
August 2020 sports events in France
Cycling events postponed due to the COVID-19 pandemic